The Four Wangs were four Chinese landscape painters during the Qing dynasty in the 17th century, all with the surname Wang. They are best known for their accomplishments in shan shui painting.

The painters
They were Wang Shimin (1592–1680), Wang Jian (1598–1677), Wang Hui (1632–1717) and Wang Yuanqi (1642–1715). They were members of the group known as the Six Masters of the early Qing period.

Philosophy 
The Four Wangs represented the so-called "orthodox school" of painting at the time. The school was based on the teachings of Dong Qichang (1555–1636). It was “orthodox” in the Confucian sense that it had continuing traditional modes, as they were in contrast to the "Individualist" painters such as Bada Shanren and Shitao.

See also 
Four Masters of the Yuan Dynasty
Four Masters of the Ming Dynasty

References

Further reading

External links
Four Wangs' Painting Galleries at China Online Museum

Wang
Quartets